The 2010–2011 Vanderbilt Commodores men's basketball team represented Vanderbilt University during the 2010–11 NCAA Division I men's basketball season. The Commodores, led by twelfth year head coach Kevin Stallings, played their home games at the Memorial Gymnasium and are members of the Southeastern Conference. They finished the season 23–11, 9–7 in SEC play and lost in the semifinals of the 2011 SEC men's basketball tournament to Florida. They received an at-large bid in the 2011 NCAA Division I men's basketball tournament. With a second round upset to Richmond, they have lost in their first tournament game in their last three tournament appearances.

Roster

Schedule

|-
!colspan=9 style=| Exhibition

|-
!colspan=9 style=| Regular season

|-
!colspan=9 style=| SEC tournament

|-
!colspan=9 style=| NCAA tournament

References

Vanderbilt
Vanderbilt Commodores men's basketball seasons
Vanderbilt
Vanderbilt Commodores men's basketball
Vanderbilt Commodores men's basketball